The National Three Peaks Challenge is an event in which participants attempt to climb the highest mountains of England, Scotland and Wales within 24 hours. It is frequently used to raise money for charitable organisations. Walkers climb each peak in turn, and are driven from the foot of one mountain to the next. The three peaks are:
Ben Nevis / , the highest mountain in Scotland
Scafell Pike, the highest mountain in England
Snowdon / , the highest mountain in Wales

Ben Nevis

Ben Nevis is the highest mountain in the British Isles. It is located at the western end of the Grampian Mountains in the Lochaber area of the Scottish Highlands, close to the town of Fort William. It attracts an estimated 100,000 ascents a year, around three-quarters of which are made using the Pony Track from Glen Nevis on the south side of the mountain.

The meteorological data collected during this period is still important for understanding Scottish mountain weather. Charles Thomson Rees Wilson was inspired to invent the cloud chamber after a period spent working at the observatory, for which he was joint winner of the Nobel Prize in Physics in 1927.

Scafell Pike

It is located in Lake District National Park, in Cumbria.

Scafell Pike consists of igneous rock dating from the Ordovician geologically part of the Borrowdale Volcanics. The summit plateau of Scafell Pike, and that of other neighbouring  peaks, is covered with shattered rock debris which provides the highest altitude example of a summit boulder field in England. The boulder field is thought to have been caused in part by weathering, such as frost action. Additional factors are also considered to be important, however opinion varies as to what these may be. Clifton Ward suggested that weathering with earthquakes as a secondary agent could be responsible, while J. E. Marr and R. A. Daly believed that earthquakes were unnecessary and suggested that frost action with other unspecified agents was more likely. To the north of the summit are a number of high altitude ghylls or ravines, containing streams which flow into Lingmell Beck. These are good examples in Cumbria for this type of stream, and are also biologically important due to their species richness.

Snowdon

It is located in Snowdonia National Park in Gwynedd, and has been described as "probably the busiest mountain in Britain". It is designated as a national nature reserve for its rare flora and fauna.

The rocks that form Snowdon were produced by volcanoes in the Ordovician period, and the massif has been extensively sculpted by glaciation, forming the pyramidal peak of Snowdon and the arêtes of Crib Goch and Y Lliwedd. The cliff faces on Snowdon, including Clogwyn Du'r Arddu, are significant for rock climbing, and the mountain was used by Edmund Hillary in training for the 1953 ascent of Mount Everest.

Snowdon affords some of the best views in Britain, and the summit can be reached by a number of well-known paths. The summit also houses a visitor centre called , opened in 2009 to replace one built in the 1930s.

The name Snowdon is from the Old English for "snow hill", while the Welsh name –  – means "the tumulus", which may refer to the cairn thrown over the legendary giant Rhitta Gawr after his defeat by King Arthur.

Logistics
Ronald Turnbull argues that it makes sense to tackle the summits from north to south, starting at Ben Nevis in the evening, and ending at Snowdon the following day. This is because the descent of Ben Nevis is the easiest of the three to do in fading light, particularly the lower section below Lochan Meall an t-Suidhe ("Half-Way Lochan"), and because the night can be used for driving down the A74(M) and M74 motorways to Scafell Pike. This then entails climbing Scafell Pike early the following morning and driving to Snowdonia for the early afternoon, in order to climb Snowdon and descend again by the evening. Scafell Pike can be climbed either from the north side starting at Seathwaite (Borrowdale) or from the south side, starting at Wasdale Head. The Wasdale approach is a longer drive but provides a shorter walk. Snowdon is climbed from Pen-y-Pass, although an alternative descent leads to Llanberis, and takes an additional 15 minutes.

Variations of the basic format have also been achieved, such as replacing the driving sections with the use of public transport, or sailing between the three peaks across the Irish Sea.

This walk (or similar - comprising in fact Ben Nevis, Scafell and Snowdon) was first done within 23 hours in 1926 by Dr Charles Hadfield and Mr W. N. Pape. The driver was Mr H. P. Cain. The three conceived it as a 'Joy Joke.' They were all keen rock and fell walkers. It was reported in the Observer on 6 June 26 and in the Penrith Observer on Tuesday 8 June 1926.

Environmental impact

There is some controversy about the environmental impact of the Three Peaks Challenge. In an editorial in the British Mountaineering Council's Summit magazine, Jill Hudson argues that the Three Peaks Challenge should be shunned as it costs charities more to clean up after participants than they raise by taking part. In 2011, Wanderlust magazine placed the challenge on a list of destinations in need of greater care, and that the numbers of participants should be limited. Organisers disagree, arguing that the 30,000 participants in the Three Peaks Challenge is small compared to the 250,000 who climb Snowdon annually. Since March 2010, the Fundraising Standards Board has acted as a centralised hub for complaints from the National Parks about groups engaged in the National Three Peaks Challenge.

See also
Three Peaks yacht race
Yorkshire Three Peaks
Five Peaks Challenge
Snaefell, the highest mountain on the Isle of Man
Slieve Donard, the highest mountain in Northern Ireland
Carrauntoohil, the highest mountain in the Republic of Ireland

Further reading

Notable People

Notable people to have completed the Three Peaks Challenge include:
 Les Ferdinand – Tottenham and England footballer.

References

Bibliography

External links

Challenge walks
Peak bagging in the United Kingdom